The 2021–22 La Salle Explorers men's basketball team represented La Salle University during the 2021–22 NCAA Division I men's basketball season. The Explorers, led by fourth-year head coach Ashley Howard, played their home games at Tom Gola Arena in Philadelphia, Pennsylvania as members of the Atlantic 10 Conference. They finished the season 11–19, 5–13 in A-10 play to finish in a tie for 12th place. As the No. 12 seed in the A-10 tournament, they defeated Saint Joseph's in the first round before losing to Saint Louis in the second round.

On March 21, 2022, the school fired head coach Ashley Howard.

Previous season 
In a season limited due to the ongoing COVID-19 pandemic, the Explorers finished the 2020–21 season 9–16, 6–11 in A-10 play to finish in 12th place. They lost in the first round of the A-10 tournament to Saint Joseph's.

Offseason

Departures

Incoming Transfers

2021 recruiting class

Roster 

Source

Schedule and results

|-
!colspan=9 style=| Non-conference regular season

|-
!colspan=9 style=|Atlantic 10 regular season

|-
!colspan=9 style=| Atlantic 10 tournament

Source

References

La Salle Explorers men's basketball seasons
La Salle
La Salle
La Salle